El Labban is a  neighborhood in Alexandria, Egypt. It lies next to West Port.

See also 

 Neighborhoods in Alexandria

Neighbourhoods of Alexandria